Lineker is a surname of medieval English origin, a variant spelling of the name found also as Linacre, Linaker, Linneker, Liniker, Linnecor, Linnecar, Linegar and Linnegar. As of about 2016, 411 people bore one or another variant of this surname in Great Britain and 6 in Ireland; in 1881, 155 people in Great Britain bore one.

The surname originated as be a locative name, given to people from places whose names are now generally spelled Linacre. Such place-names in turn derive from Middle English līn ('flax') and aker ('field'), thus denoting places associated with a flax-field. The name is first attested in the Domesday Book of 1086, which mentions a Cambridgeshire man named Godwin de Linacra.

Notable people with the surname include:
Danielle Lineker (born 1979), Welsh model, Ex-wife of Gary Lineker
Gary Lineker (born 1960), former English footballer
John Lineker (born 1990), Brazilian mixed martial artist
Matt Lineker (born 1985), English cricketer

See also
 Linacre (surname)

References

English-language surnames